Genome Canada is a non-profit organization that aims to use genomics-based technologies to improve the lives of Canadians. It is funded by the Government of Canada. Genome Canada provides large-scale investments that develop new technologies, connect the public sector with private industry, and create solutions to problems of national interest, such as health, sustainable resources, the environment, and energy.

Genome Canada also funds research on the ethical, environmental, economic, legal and social aspects of genomics, which they call GE3LS (the same research direction is called ELSI or ELSA in the United States and in Europe, respectively). This includes topics such as genetic privacy and genetic discrimination, as well as public acceptance of genetically modified organisms. Genome Canada researchers generate policy briefs on these and other topics.

Currently, there are six regional genome centres in Canada that receive funding from Genome Canada:
Genome British Columbia
Genome Alberta
Genome Prairie
Ontario Genomics
Genome Québec
Genome Atlantic

Between 2000 and 2017, Genome Canada provided 1.5 billion Canadian dollars in genomics funding, which has attracted an additional C$ 2.1 billion in co-funding from partners in the private, public and non-profit sectors within Canada and internationally.

The President and CEO of Genome Canada is Rob Annan. The current Chair of the Board of Directors is Elizabeth Douville.

References

External links
 Official website

Federal departments and agencies of Canada
Genetics or genomics research institutions